Yunnan Baiyao Group Co., Ltd is a Chinese pharmaceutical company that develops and manufactures pharmaceutical products (mainly traditional Chinese medicine) and the wholesale and retail of pharmaceutical products. 

The Government Pension Fund of Norway has excluded the company from investments since 21 December 2021, since the company "uses and sells body parts from pangolins which is a globally endangered species".

Corporate affairs
As of December 31, 2007, the company had 12 subsidiaries, engaged in the pharmaceutical industry, and four major associates, involved in securities, investment and biotechnological research.

Products
Its core product range includes the Yunnan Bai Yao series and the Natural Vegetable series. The company is also involved in the operation of hotels and department stores. For the fiscal year of 2007, YBG obtained approximately 99% of its total revenue from the sale of pharmaceutical products.

Violations of fundamental norms
On 21 December 2021, the Government Pension Fund of Norway, the world's largest sovereign wealth fund, divested from the company. The reason for the divestment and exclusion of the company is "due to unacceptable risk that the company contributes to serious environmental damage". More specifically, the company "uses and sells body parts from pangolins which is a globally endangered species".

See also
Pharmaceutical industry in China
Biotechnology industry in China

References

External links
Website

Pharmaceutical companies of China
Government-owned companies of China
Companies based in Kunming
Companies in the CSI 100 Index
Companies listed on the Shenzhen Stock Exchange